Xmas is an abbreviation for Christmas

Xmas or variant, may also refer to:

 Christmas, a Christian holiday
 X MAS, the Decima Flottiglia MAS, a frogman unit of the Italian military
 Xmas ("eks-mas"), a fictional holiday from Futurama shown in "The Futurama Holiday Spectacular"
 Xmas (film), a 2015 film
 X-Mas (EP), a 2014 record by Stevie Ann
 X-Mas: The Metal Way, a 1994 record by Paul Di'Anno
 "X-Mas 1", an episode of Pucca
 "X-Mas 2", an episode of Pucca

See also

 X-Mass Festival, a European music festival
 "Xmas Story", a 1999 season 2 episode 4 of Futurama
 "Xmas Day" (song), a 2001 song by 'Sevendust' off the album Animosity
 ZE Xmas Record, the CD version of the 1981 LP A Christmas Record
 The Xmas EP, a 2013 record by Never Shout Never
 "This X-Mas", a 2017 song by Chris Brown from Heartbreak on a Full Moon
 
 
 Christmas (disambiguation)
 XMA (disambiguation)
 mas (disambiguation)